Felix the Cat is a cartoon character created in 1919 by Pat Sullivan and Otto Messmer during the silent film era. An anthropomorphic young black cat with white eyes, a black body, and a giant grin,  he is often considered one of the most recognized cartoon characters in film history. Felix was the first fully realized animal character in the history of American film animation.

Felix originated from the studio of Australian cartoonist-film entrepreneur Pat Sullivan. Either Sullivan himself or his lead animator, American Otto Messmer, created the character. What is certain is that Felix emerged from Sullivan's studio, and cartoons featuring the character became well known in popular culture. Aside from the animated shorts, Felix starred in a comic strip (drawn by Sullivan, Messmer and later Joe Oriolo) beginning in 1923, and his image soon adorned merchandise such as ceramics, toys and postcards. Several manufacturers made stuffed Felix toys. Jazz bands such as Paul Whiteman's played songs about him (1923's "Felix Kept on Walking" and others). In 1926, Felix became the first high school mascot for the Logansport, Indiana, Berries.

By the late 1920s, with the arrival of sound cartoons, Felix's success was fading. The new Disney shorts of Mickey Mouse made the silent offerings of Sullivan and Messmer, who were then unwilling to move to sound production, seem outdated. In 1929, Sullivan decided to make the transition and began distributing Felix sound cartoons through Copley Pictures. The sound Felix shorts proved to be a failure and the operation ended in 1932. Felix saw a brief three-cartoon resurrection in 1936 by the Van Beuren Studios.

Felix cartoons began airing on American television in 1953. Joe Oriolo introduced a redesigned, "long-legged" Felix, with longer legs, a much smaller body, and a larger, rounder head with no whiskers and no teeth. Oriolo also added new characters and gave Felix a "Magic Bag of Tricks" that could assume an infinite variety of shapes at Felix's behest. The cat has since starred in other television programs and in two feature films. As of the 2010s, Felix is featured on a variety of merchandise from clothing to toys. Joe's son Don Oriolo later assumed creative control of Felix.

In 2002, TV Guide ranked Felix the Cat number 28 on its "50 Greatest Cartoon Characters of All Time" list.

In 2014, Don Oriolo sold the rights to the character to DreamWorks Animation, which is now part of Comcast's NBCUniversal division via Universal Pictures.

Creation

On 9 November 1919, Master Tom, a prototype of Felix, debuted in a Paramount Pictures short titled Feline Follies. Produced by the New York City-based animation studio owned by Pat Sullivan, the cartoon was directed by cartoonist and animator Otto Messmer. It was a success, and the Sullivan studio quickly set to work on producing another film featuring Master Tom, in Musical Mews (released 16 November 1919). It too proved to be successful with audiences. Messmer claimed that John King of Paramount Magazine suggested the name "Felix", for contrast of the felicity traditionally associated with a black cat. The name was first used for the third film starring the character, The Adventures of Felix (released on 14 December 1919). Sullivan claimed he named Felix after Australia Felix from Australian history and literature. In 1924, animator Bill Nolan redesigned the character, making him both rounder and cuter. Felix's new looks, coupled with Messmer's character animation, brought Felix to a higher profile.

Authorship
The question of who created Felix remains a matter of dispute. Sullivan stated in numerous newspaper interviews that he created Felix and did the key drawings for the character. On a visit to Australia in 1925, Sullivan told The Argus newspaper that "[t]he idea was given to me by the sight of a cat which my wife brought to the studio one day". On other occasions, he claimed that Felix had been inspired by Rudyard Kipling's "The Cat that Walked by Himself" or by his wife's love for strays. Members of the Australian Cartoonist Association have claimed that lettering used in Feline Follies matches Sullivan's handwriting and that Sullivan lettered within his drawings. In addition, at roughly the 4:00 mark in Feline Follies, the words 'Lo Mum' are used in a speech bubble by one of the kittens; this was a term for one's mother not used by Americans, but certainly by Australians. Yet Messmer claimed to have single-handedly drawn Feline Follies from home, raising questions as to why an American would use the term 'Mum' in a cartoon he solely drew himself. Sullivan's supporters also say the case is supported by his 18 March 1917 release of a cartoon short titled The Tail of Thomas Kat more than two years prior to Feline Follies. Both an Australian ABC-TV documentary screened in 2004 and the curators of an exhibition at the State Library of New South Wales in 2005 suggested that Thomas Kat was a prototype or precursor of Felix. However, few details of Thomas have survived. His fur color has not been definitively established, and the surviving copyright synopsis for the short suggests significant differences between Thomas and the later Felix. For example, whereas the later Felix magically transforms his tail into tools and other objects, Thomas is a non-anthropomorphized cat who loses his tail in a fight with a rooster, never to recover it.

Sullivan was the studio proprietor and—as is the case with almost all film entrepreneurs—he owned the copyright to any creative work by his employees. In common with many animators at the time, Messmer was not credited. After Sullivan's death in 1933, his estate in Australia took ownership of the character, although Messmer told Harry Kopp that Sullivan promised him the rights to Felix in his will, no such will existed by the time he died. Kopp and the estate got the rights in 1934 from King Features Syndicate after numerous conferences with him.

It was not until after Sullivan's death that Sullivan staffers such as Hal Walker, Al Eugster, Gerry Geronimi, Rudy Zamora, George Cannata, and Sullivan's own lawyer, Harry Kopp, credited Messmer with Felix's creation. They claimed that Felix was based on an animated Charlie Chaplin that Messmer had animated for Sullivan's studio earlier on. The down-and-out personality and movements of the cat in Feline Follies reflect key attributes of Chaplin's, and, although blockier than the later Felix, the familiar black body is already there (Messmer found solid shapes easier to animate). Messmer himself recalled his version of the cat's creation in an interview with animation historian John Canemaker:

Further, Messmer told Canemaker that both he and Sullivan drew Felix based on models from the minstrel show tradition and the pickaninny caricature:

The tropes of minstrelsy were useful for creating a cartoon animal because they cued the audience to expect a lively, amusing and rebellious character.

Animation historians back Messmer's claims. Among them are Michael Barrier, Jerry Beck, Colin and Timothy Cowles, Donald Crafton, David Gerstein, Milt Gray, Mark Kausler, Leonard Maltin, and Charles Solomon. No animation historians outside of Australia have argued on behalf of Sullivan.

Sullivan marketed the cat relentlessly while Messmer continued to produce a prodigious volume of Felix cartoons. Messmer did the animation on white paper with inkers tracing the drawings directly. The animators drew backgrounds onto pieces of celluloid, which were then laid atop the drawings to be photographed. Any perspective work had to be animated by hand, as the studio cameras were unable to perform pans or trucks.

Popularity and distribution
Paramount Pictures distributed the earliest films from 1919 to 1921. Margaret J. Winkler distributed the shorts from 1922 to 1925, the year when Educational Pictures took over the distribution of the shorts. Sullivan promised them one new Felix short every two weeks. The combination of solid animation, skillful promotion, and widespread distribution brought Felix's popularity to new heights.

References to alcoholism and Prohibition were also commonplace in many of the Felix shorts, particularly Felix Finds Out (1924), Whys and Other Whys (1927), and Felix Woos Whoopee (1930), to name a few. In Felix Dopes It Out (1924), Felix tries to help his hobo friend who is plagued with a red nose. By the end of the short, the cat finds the cure for the condition: "Keep drinking, and it'll turn blue".

Felix's great success also spawned a host of imitators. The appearances and personalities of other 1920s feline stars such as Julius of Walt Disney's Alice Comedies, Waffles of Paul Terry's Aesop's Film Fables, and especially Bill Nolan's 1925 adaptation of Krazy Kat (distributed by the eschewed Winkler) all seem to have been directly patterned after Felix. This influence also extended outside the United States, serving as inspiration for Suihō Tagawa in the creation of his character Norakuro, a dog with black fur.

Felix's cartoons were also popular among critics. They have been cited as imaginative examples of surrealism in filmmaking. Felix has been said to represent a child's sense of wonder, creating the fantastic when it is not there, and taking it in stride when it is. His famous pace—hands behind his back, head down, deep in thought—became a trademark that has been analyzed by critics around the world. Felix's expressive tail, which could be a shovel one moment, an exclamation mark or pencil the next, serves to emphasize that anything can happen in his world. Aldous Huxley wrote that the Felix shorts proved that "[w]hat the cinema can do better than literature or the spoken drama is to be fantastic".

By 1923, the character was at the peak of his film career. Felix in Hollywood, a short released during that year, plays upon Felix's popularity, as he becomes acquainted with such fellow celebrities as Douglas Fairbanks, Cecil B. DeMille, Charlie Chaplin, Ben Turpin, and even censor Will H. Hays. His image could be seen on clocks (not to be confused with the Kit-Cat Klock) and Christmas ornaments. Felix also became the subject of several popular songs of the day, such as "Felix Kept Walking" by Paul Whiteman. Sullivan made an estimated $100,000 a year from toy licensing alone. With the character's success also emerged a handful of new costars. These included Felix's master Willie Jones, a mouse named Skiddoo, Felix's nephews Inky, Dinky, and Winky, and his girlfriend Kitty. Felix the Cat sheet music, with music by Pete Wendling and Max Kortlander and featuring lyrics by Alfred Bryan, was published in 1928 by Sam Fox Publishing Company. The cover art of Felix playing a banjo was done by Otto Messmer.

Most of the early Felix cartoons mirrored American attitudes of the "Roaring Twenties". Ethnic stereotypes appeared in such shorts as Felix Goes Hungry (1924). Recent events such as the Russian Civil War were depicted in shorts like Felix All Puzzled (1924). Flappers were caricatured in Felix Strikes It Rich (1923). He also became involved in union organizing with Felix Revolts (also 1923). In some shorts, Felix even performed a rendition of the Charleston.

In 1928, Educational ceased releasing the Felix cartoons, and several were reissued by First National Pictures. Copley Pictures distributed them from 1929 to 1930. There was a brief three-cartoon resurrection in 1936 by the Van Beuren Studios (The Goose That Laid the Golden Egg, Neptune Nonsense, and Bold King Cole), which are all directed by Disney alumni Burt Gillett, who was suffering from bipolar disorder at the time. Sullivan did most of the marketing for the character in the 1920s. In these Van Beuren shorts, Felix spoke and sang in a high-pitched, childlike voice provided by then-21-year-old Walter Tetley, who was a popular radio actor in the 1930s, 1940s and even 1950s (Julius on The Phil Harris-Alice Faye Show, and Leroy on The Great Gildersleeve), but later best known in the 1960s as the voice of Sherman on The Rocky and Bullwinkle Shows Mister Peabody segments.

Felix as mascot and pop culture icon

Given the character's unprecedented popularity and the fact that his name was partially derived from the Latin word for "happy", some rather notable individuals and organizations adopted Felix as a mascot. The first of these was a Los Angeles Chevrolet dealer and friend of Pat Sullivan named Winslow B. Felix, who first opened his showroom in 1921. The three-sided neon sign of Felix Chevrolet, with its giant, smiling images of the character, is today one of LA's better-known landmarks, standing watch over both Figueroa Street and the Harbor Freeway. Others who adopted Felix included the 1922 New York Yankees and pilot and actress Ruth Elder, who took a Felix doll with her in an attempt to become the first woman to duplicate Charles Lindbergh's transatlantic crossing to Paris.

This popularity persisted. In the late 1920s, the U.S. Navy's Bombing Squadron Two (VB-2B) adopted a unit insignia consisting of Felix happily carrying a bomb with a burning fuse. They retained the insignia through the 1930s, when they became a fighter squadron under the designations VF-6B and, later, VF-3, whose members Edward O'Hare and John Thach became famous naval aviators in World War II. After the world war, a U.S. Navy fighter squadron currently designated VFA-31 replaced its winged meat-cleaver logo with the same insignia after the original Felix squadron had been disbanded. The carrier-based night-fighter squadron, nicknamed the "Tomcatters", remained active under various designations continuing to the present day, and Felix still appears on both the squadron's cloth jacket patches and aircraft, carrying his bomb with its fuse burning.

Felix is also the oldest high school mascot in the state of Indiana, chosen in 1926 after a Logansport High School player brought his plush Felix to a basketball game. When the team came from behind and won that night, Felix became the mascot of all the Logansport High School sports teams.

When television was in the experimental stages in 1928, the very first image to ever be seen was a toy Felix the Cat mounted to a revolving phonograph turntable. It remained on screen for hours while engineers used it as a test pattern.

Over a century after his debut on screen in 1919, he still makes occasional appearances in pop culture. The pop punk band The Queers also use Felix as a mascot, often drawn to reflect punk sensibilities and attributes such as scowling, smoking, or playing the guitar. Felix adorns the covers of both the Surf Goddess EP and the Move Back Home album. Felix also appears in the music video for the single "Don't Back Down". Besides appearing on the covers and liner notes of various albums, the iconic cat also appears in merchandise such as T-shirts and buttons. (In an interview with bassist B-Face, he asserts that Lookout! Records is responsible for the use of Felix as a mascot.) Felix was originally going to make a cameo in the 1988 film Who Framed Roger Rabbit but the rights for him were not obtained. However he does appear on the tragedy and comedy keystone entrance to ToonTown and (as a giant puppet) at the 2015 Treefort Music Fest. For Felix the Cat's 100th anniversary, Universal Pictures dubbed 9 November "Felix the Cat Day" and released new merchandise, including a Pop! figure, Skechers brand shoes, clocks, a PEZ dispenser, shirts, bags, pillows, and pomade. Also for the anniversary, the National Film and Sound Archive of Australia (NFSA) released an article detailing Felix the Cat's history with frames and clips from early animations.

Comics

Pat Sullivan began a syndicated comic strip on 19 August 1923 distributed by King Features Syndicate. In 1927 Messmer took over drawing duties of the strip. (The first The Felix Annual from 1924 issued in Great Britain shows the last two stories are not the usual Otto Messmer style, so a difference in Pat Sullivan-drawn cartoons can be noted.)

Messmer himself pursued the Sunday Felix comic strips until their discontinuance in 1943, when he began eleven years of writing and drawing Felix comic books for Dell Comics that were released every other month. Jack Mendelsohn was the ghostwriter of the Felix strip from 1948 to 1952. In 1954, Messmer retired from the Felix daily newspaper strips, and his assistant Joe Oriolo (the creator of Casper the Friendly Ghost) took over. The strip concluded in 1966.

Felix co-starred with Betty Boop in the Betty Boop and Felix comic strip (1984–1987).

After 35 years of not being in any comics, Source Point Press announced that Felix the Cat would get a new comic book series, with the permission by Dreamworks Animation to use the character, following a decade of owning the character and using him as a fashion brand. The comic is written by Mark Federali, illustrated by Trace Yardley, and was due to be released sometime in 2022. Yardley later said in February 2022 that production has been delayed and Source Point Press is no longer publishing the books. However, in September, Yardley said that the comic was not cancelled, and that it will be published by Rocketship Entertainment. A month later, Rocketship announced that artists and writers, inciuding Mike Federali, would be attending New York Comic Con. Federali signed copies of the comic. On November 15, Rocketship announced through its new imprint Bottlerocket, that the comic will release in the Spring of 2023.

From silent to sound

With the advent of synchronized sound in The Jazz Singer in 1927, Educational Pictures, who distributed the Felix shorts at the time, urged Pat Sullivan to make the leap to "talkie" cartoons, but Sullivan refused. Further disputes led to a break between Educational and Sullivan. Only after competing studios released the first synchronized-sound animated films, such as Fleischer's My Old Kentucky Home, Van Beuren's Dinner Time and Disney's Steamboat Willie, did Sullivan see the possibilities of sound. He managed to secure a contract with First National Pictures in 1928. However, for reasons unknown, this did not last, so Sullivan sought out Jacques Kopfstein and Copley Pictures to distribute his new sound Felix cartoons. On 16 October 1929, an advertisement appeared in Film Daily with Felix announcing, Jolson-like, "You ain't heard nothin' yet!"

Felix's transition to sound was not a smooth one. Sullivan did not carefully prepare for Felix's transition to sound and added sound effects into the sound cartoons as a post-animation process. The results were disastrous. More than ever, it seemed as though Disney's mouse was drawing audiences away from Sullivan's silent star. Not even entries such as the Fleischer-style off-beat Felix Woos Whoopee or the Silly Symphony-esque April Maze (both 1930) could regain the franchise's audience. Kopfstein finally canceled Sullivan's contract. Subsequently, he announced plans to start a new studio in California, but such ideas never materialized. Things went from bad to worse when Sullivan's wife, Marjorie, died in March 1932. After this, Sullivan completely fell apart. He slumped into an alcoholic depression, his health rapidly declined, and his memory began to fade. He could not even cash checks to Messmer because his signature was reduced to a mere scribble. He died in 1933. Messmer recalled, "He left everything a mess, no books, no nothing. So when he died the place had to close down, at the height of popularity, when everybody, RKO and all of them, for years they tried to get hold of Felix... I didn't have that permission [to continue the character] 'cause I didn't have legal ownership of it".

In 1935, Amadee J. Van Beuren of the Van Beuren Studios called Messmer and asked him if he could return Felix to the screen. Van Beuren even stated that Messmer would be provided with a full staff and all of the necessary utilities. However, Messmer declined his offer and instead recommended Burt Gillett, a former Sullivan staffer who was now heading the Van Beuren staff. So, in 1936, Van Beuren obtained approval from Sullivan's brother to license Felix to his studio with the intention of producing new shorts both in color and with sound. With Gillett at the helm, now with a heavy Disney influence, he did away with Felix's established personality, rendering him a stock talking animal character of the type popular in the day. The new shorts were unsuccessful, and after only three outings Van Beuren discontinued the series, leaving a fourth in the storyboard stages.

Revival

In 1953, Official Films purchased the Sullivan–Messmer shorts, added soundtracks to them, and distributed them to the home movie and television markets.

Otto Messmer's assistant Joe Oriolo, who had taken over the Felix comic strip, struck a deal with Felix's new owner, Pat Sullivan's nephew, to begin a new series of Felix cartoons on television. Oriolo went on to star Felix in 260 television cartoons produced by Famous Studios which was renamed to Paramount Cartoon Studios, and distributed by Trans-Lux beginning in 1958. Like the Van Beuren studio before, Oriolo gave Felix a more domesticated and pedestrian personality geared more toward children and introduced now-familiar elements such as Felix's Magic Bag of Tricks, a satchel that could assume the shape and characteristics of anything Felix wanted. The show did away with Felix's previous supporting cast and introduced many new characters, all of which were performed by voice actor Jack Mercer.

Oriolo's plots revolve around the unsuccessful attempts of the antagonists to steal Felix's Magic Bag, though in an unusual twist, these antagonists are occasionally depicted as Felix's friends as well. The cartoons proved popular, but critics have dismissed them as paling in comparison to the earlier Sullivan–Messmer works, especially since Oriolo aimed the cartoons at children. Limited animation (required due to budgetary restraints) and simplistic storylines did nothing to diminish the series' popularity.

In 1970, Oriolo gained complete control of the Felix character and Don Oriolo continues to promote the character to this day, even though the rights are now owned by Dreamworks.

In the late 1980s, after his father's death, Don Oriolo teamed up with European animators to work on the character's first feature film, Felix the Cat: The Movie. In the film, Felix visits an alternate reality along with the Professor and Poindexter. New World Pictures planned a 1987 Thanksgiving release for U.S. theaters, which did not happen; the movie went direct-to-video in August 1991, which was widely panned upon its release before being completely abandoned in the US during the 21st century. In 1994, Felix appeared on television again, to replace the popular Fido Dido bumpers on CBS, and then one year later in the series The Twisted Tales of Felix the Cat. Baby Felix followed in 2000 for the Japanese market, and also the direct-to-video Felix the Cat Saves Christmas released in 2004. Oriolo also brought about a new wave of Felix merchandising, including Wendy's Kids Meal toys and a video game for the Nintendo Entertainment System.

Felix was voted in 2004 among the 100 Greatest Cartoons in a poll conducted by the British television channel Channel 4, ranking at No. 89.

According to Don Oriolo's Felix the Cat blog, as of September 2008 there were plans in development for a new television series. Oriolo's biography page also mentions a 52-episode cartoon series then in the works titled The Felix the Cat Show, which was slated to use computer graphics. As of December 2020, WildBrain is working on a new Felix the Cat series with Transformers: Rescue Bots and Snoopy in Space co-producers.
Oriolo has not produced or directed any cartoons or feature films featuring Felix the Cat since the mid-2000s.

Home video
DVD releases include Presenting Felix the Cat from Bosko Video; Felix! from Lumivision; Felix the Cat: The Collector's Edition from Delta Entertainment; and Before Walt from Inkwell Images Ink. Some of the TV series cartoons (from 1958 to 1959) were released on DVD by Classic Media. Some of the 1990s series has also been released.

Filmography

See also

 Animation in the United States during the silent era
 Baby Felix
 Golden Age of American animation
 Kit-Cat Klock
 Winsor McCay

Notes

References

Further reading
 Patricia Vettel Tom (1996): Felix the Cat as Modern Trickster.  American Art, Vol. 10, No. 1 (Spring, 1996), pp. 64–87

External links

 
 Felix the Cat at Don Markstein's Toonopedia. Archived from the original on 15 July 2016.
 Pat Sulivan at the Internet Archive.
 The Classic Felix the Cat Page at Golden Age Cartoons
 
 Australian Broadcasting Corporation, 2004, Rewind "Felix the Cat" (Concerns the dispute over who created the character.)
  . Exhibition guide, including many pictures.
 

 
Film characters introduced in 1919
Film series introduced in 1919
1923 comics debuts
History of animation
Animated characters
American comics characters
Comedy film characters
Comedy television characters
Humor comics
Adventure comics
Anthropomorphic cats
DreamWorks Classics
Animated film series
Fictional anthropomorphic characters
Male characters in animation
Male characters in comics
Male characters in advertising
Fictional characters from New York City
Cat mascots
Corporate mascots
Automobile advertising characters
Articles containing video clips
Short film series
Van Beuren Studios
Universal Pictures cartoons and characters
Fictional pranksters
Animated characters introduced in 1919